Bizet is a Brussels Metro station on the western branch of line 5. It is located in the municipality of Anderlecht, in the western part of Brussels, Belgium. It received its name from the /, the city square aboveground, which had been named after the French classical music composer Georges Bizet.

The metro station opened on 10 January 1992, and until 2003, it was the western terminus of former east–west line 1B. On 15 September 2003, a further extension from Bizet westwards to Erasme/Erasmus was opened. Following the reorganisation of the Brussels Metro on 4 April 2009, it is served by line 5.

External links

Brussels metro stations
Railway stations opened in 1992
Anderlecht